Spare Me may refer to:

 "Spare Me" (Beavis and Butt-head), an episode of Beavis and Butt-head
 Spare Me (film), a 1992 film